Racicot is a surname of French origin. People with that name include:

 André Racicot (born 1969), Canadian ice hockey player
 Ernest Racicot (1835–1909), Canadian politician
 Isabelle Racicot (born 1972), Canadian television host
 Marc Racicot (born 1948), American politician
 Pierre Racicot (1967), Canadian hockey player
 Zotique Racicot (1845–1915), Canadian priest

Surnames of French origin